Mount Adams, also known as The Mount, is a historic home and farm complex located at Bel Air, Harford County, Maryland, United States. The complex consists of a  working farm, originally part of Broom's Bloom, centered on a large, multi-sectioned, -story frame house built in 1817 in the Federal style.  The house has an 1850, -story cross-gabled addition, connected, but an independent unit from the main house, and slightly taller in the Greek Revival style. The property include a stone bank barn, a stone-and-stucco dairy, a stone-and-stucco privy, all dating from the early 19th century, as well as a family cemetery. Its builder was Captain John Adams Webster.

Mount Adams was listed on the National Register of Historic Places in 1988.

References

External links
, including photo from 1977, Maryland Historical Trust website
The Mount, Fountain Green Road (State Route 543), Creswell vicinity, Harford, MD at the Historic American Buildings Survey (HABS)

Houses on the National Register of Historic Places in Maryland
Houses in Bel Air, Harford County, Maryland
Houses completed in 1817
Federal architecture in Maryland
Greek Revival houses in Maryland
Historic American Buildings Survey in Maryland
National Register of Historic Places in Harford County, Maryland